Bernd Lehmann (born 1 September 1947) is a German former footballer who played as an attacking midfielder.

References

External links
 Bernd Lehmann at racingstub.com 
 
 

1947 births
Living people
German footballers
Association football midfielders
Bundesliga players
Ligue 1 players
MSV Duisburg players
RC Strasbourg Alsace players
German expatriate footballers
German expatriate sportspeople in France
Expatriate footballers in France
Sportspeople from Krefeld
Footballers from North Rhine-Westphalia